The Journal of Advanced Manufacturing Systems is an academic journal founded in 2002 and published by World Scientific. It contains articles relating to advanced manufacturing, in terms of "research and development, product development, process planning, resource planning, applications, and tools". This includes topics such as collaborative design, resource simulation, virtual reality technologies and applications, and supply chain management.

Abstracting and indexing 
The journal is abstracted and indexed in Compendex and Inspec.

References 

English-language journals
Publications established in 2002
World Scientific academic journals
Business and management journals
2002 establishments in Singapore